Can You Do Me Good? is the sixth studio album by Del Amitri, released on 8 April 2002 by Mercury / A&M.

The album showcased a radically different sound from which Del Amitri fans had become used to. With five years having elapsed since Some Other Sucker's Parade (1997), Can You Do Me Good? featured a new approach: drum loops, samples and synthesisers were the band's new tools. Though the songs retained their usual melodic characteristics, the overall impression was a very different one.

Theme 
Guitarist and songwriter Iain Harvie admitted in the run-up to the album's release that the band's record company considered Can You Do Me Good? to be Del Amitri's last chance. "It's a pretty straightforward equation. If we don't sell 300,000 copies of the new album, we're out. It's that simple." With this in mind, many of the album's lyrics seem to convey a tone of finality; the feeling that this is a band's last stand. Song titles like "One More Last Hurrah" and "Last Cheap Shot at the Dream" contribute to this, and "Just Getting By" seems almost to lament a career spent as rock's nearly-men:

Look at me
I'm the one who got away
The one who could've shone
I tried to do my best
But I guess your best don't last for long

Look at me
Standing with my tattered pride
Of toothless little lions
We tried to make a difference
Do something no one else had tried

Even for a lyricist like Justin Currie, whose songs have often dealt with missed opportunities and failure, Can You Do Me Good? is significantly more concerned with these concepts than previous albums.

Track listing 
All songs written by Justin Currie, except as noted.
 "Just Before You Leave" (Currie, Iain Harvie) – 5:14
 "Cash & Prizes" – 4:38
 "Drunk in a Band" – 2:44
 "One More Last Hurrah" (Currie, Harvie) – 4:52
 "Buttons on My Clothes" – 4:05
 "Baby, It's Me" – 3:34
 "Wash Her Away" (Currie, Harvie) – 3:07
 "Last Cheap Shot at the Dream" – 4:12
 "Out Falls The Past" – 3:13
 "She's Passing This Way" – 2:44
 "Jesus Saves" – 3:39
 "Just Getting By" – 7:35

 "Just Getting By" is followed by a hidden track: an instrumental excerpt from "The Septic Jubilee" (a song released as a B-side on the "Just Before You Leave" single) which lasts for roughly 2:20.

Personnel
Credits adapted from the album liner notes.

Del Amitri
 Justin Currie – vocals, bass, acoustic guitar
 Iain Harvie – guitar, acoustic guitar, programming, backing vocals
 Kris Dollimore – guitar, acoustic guitar, backing vocals
 Andy Alston – piano, organ, synthesiser
 Mark Price – drums, drum loops
Additional musicians
 Matthew Rubano – bass (2, 11)
 Kevin Bacon (credited as "Big Kev") – bass (5, 6, 8)
 Rudy Bird – percussion (1, 4, 9)
 Jonathan Quarmby (credited as "Jonathan") – "tingly things" (5, 6)
 Joe Tomino – drum loop (4)
 Chris Komer – French horn (9)
 Chris Elliot – cello sample and trombone (12)
 Chris Cameron – string arrangements (1, 12)
 Gavyn Wright – orchestra leader
Technical
 Gordon "Commissioner Gordon" Williams – producer (tracks 2-4, 7, 9-11), additional producer (tracks 1, 12), mixing (tracks 1, 2, 4-9, 11, 12) (at The Headquarters, Teaneck, New Jersey)
 Pete Smith – producer (tracks 1, 3, 10, 12), mixing (tracks 3, 10) (at Livingston Studios, London)
 Kevin Bacon – producer (tracks 5, 6, 8)
 Jonathan Quarmby – producer (tracks 5, 6, 8)
 Jamie Siegel – engineer (tracks 2-4, 7, 9-11)
 Ben Darlow – mixing (tracks 3, 10) (at Livingston Studios, Wood Green), additional mixing (track 7) (at Westside Studios, London)
 Dave Bascombe – mixing (track 5) (at Whitfield Street Studios, London)
 Stylorouge – design, art direction
 Jeff Cottenden – photography
 Kevin Westenberg – photography (Del Amitri portrait)

Notes

External links 
 Official Del Amitri homepage

Del Amitri albums
2002 albums
A&M Records albums
Mercury Records albums